Martin August Sophus Suhr (29 May 1893 – 2 July 1958) was a Danish boxer who competed in the 1920 Summer Olympics. He was born in Gestelev, Ringe and died in Copenhagen. In 1920 he was eliminated in the quarter-finals of the welterweight class after losing his fight to the upcoming silver medalist Alexander Ireland.

References

External links
profile

1893 births
1958 deaths
Welterweight boxers
Olympic boxers of Denmark
Boxers at the 1920 Summer Olympics
Danish male boxers